Dmitri Aleksandrovich Hvorostovsky (16 October 1962 – 22 November 2017) was a Russian operatic baritone.

Early life and education
Hvorostovsky was born in Krasnoyarsk in Siberia during a time when the city was mostly closed to foreigners. An only child, he was raised mostly by his grandmother and a grandfather who, according to Dmitri, was a war veteran suffering from alcoholism. His father, an engineer, and his mother, a gynecologist, both had extremely time-consuming careers and were often only around on the weekends and holidays.

Career
Hvorostovsky came to international prominence in 1989 when he won the BBC Cardiff Singer of the World competition, beating local favourite Bryn Terfel in the final round. His performance included Handel's "Ombra mai fu" and "Per me giunto...O Carlo ascolta" from Verdi's Don Carlos. 

His operatic debut in the West was at the Nice Opera in Tchaikovsky's The Queen of Spades (1989). In Italy, he made his debut at La Fenice as Eugene Onegin, a success that sealed his reputation, and made his American operatic debut with the Lyric Opera of Chicago (1993) in La traviata. In 1992, he made his debut at the Royal Opera House at Covent Garden as Riccardo in Bellini's I puritani.

He subsequently sang at virtually every major opera house, including the Metropolitan Opera (debut 1995), the Berlin State Opera, La Scala and the Vienna State Opera. He was especially renowned for his portrayal of the title character in Tchaikovsky's Eugene Onegin; The New York Times described him as "born to play the role."

In 2002, Hvorostovsky performed at the Russian Children's Welfare Society's major fund raiser, the "Petrushka Ball". He was an Honorary Director of the charity. 

A recital programme of new arrangements of songs from the World War II era, Where Are You My Brothers?, was given in the spring of 2003 in front of an audience of 6,000 at the Kremlin Palace in Moscow, and seen on Russian Television by over 90 million viewers. The same programme was performed with the St. Petersburg Symphony Orchestra for survivors of the Siege of Leningrad on 16 January 2004.

In later years, Hvorostovsky's stage repertoire almost entirely consisted of Verdi operas such as Un ballo in maschera, La traviata and Simon Boccanegra. In 2009 he appeared in Il trovatore in a David McVicar production at the Metropolitan Opera with Sondra Radvanovsky.

Awards and honours 

His highest awards in Russia include the Glinka State Prize in 1991 and the People's Artist of Russia honorary title in 1995. in 2011 he was one of the recipients of the Opera News award at the Plaza in New York City for distinguished achievement.

Personal life
In 1989, Hvorostovsky married a ballerina, Svetlana. He adopted her daughter Maria, and they had two children, Daniel and Alexandra. They split up in 1999. His second wife was the Swiss soprano Florence Illi of French and Italian descent. They had two children, Nina and Maxim.

In June 2015, Hvorostovsky announced that he had been diagnosed with a brain tumour and cancelled all his performances through August. Family representatives said that he would be treated at London's cancer hospital Royal Marsden. In spite of his illness, Hvorostovsky returned to the stage at the Metropolitan Opera in September as Count di Luna in Il trovatore for a run of three performances opposite Anna Netrebko. He received strong reviews from both critics and audiences for his performance.

Death

Hvorostovsky died on 22 November 2017 in London of brain cancer.

Recordings
Hvorostovsky made many CD recordings, first with Valery Gergiev for Philips and then with Constantine Orbelian for Delos, and a number of his performances were filmed. Recordings of complete operas with Dmitri Hvorostovsky, audio or audio-video, legitimately made (often for broadcast) but not necessarily legitimately released:
 Bellini, I puritani, Domingo/Gruberová/Giordani/Hvorostovsky/Scandiuzzi, 1994, live in Vienna, Premiere Opera
 Donizetti, La Favorite, Queler/Larmore/Kunde/Hvorostovsky/Kowaljow, 2001, live in New York, House of Opera
 Gounod, Faust, Levine/Isokoski/Jepson/Alagna/Hvorostovsky/Pape, 2005, live in New York, Celestial Audio
 Gounod, Faust, Pidò/Gheorghiu/Losier/Grigòlo/Hvorostovsky/Pape, 2011, filmed in London*
 Leoncavallo, Pagliacci, Pappano/Gheorghiu/Domingo/Hvorostovsky/Ataneli, 2003, live in London, Premiere Opera
 Mascagni, Cavalleria rusticana, Bychkov/Norman/Giacomini/Hvorostovsky, 1990, Philips
 Mozart, Le nozze di Figaro, Harnoncourt/Kringlebotn/Röschmann/Graham/Hvorostovsky/Terfel, 1995, DVD filmed in Salzburg, House of Opera
 Prokofiev, Voyna i mir (War and Peace), Gergiev/Netrebko/Livengood/Balashov/Grigorian/Hvorostovsky/Ramey/Cheek, 2 March 2002, live in New York, House of Opera
 Rimsky-Korsakov, Tsarskaya nevesta (The Tsar's Bride), Gergiev/Shaguch/Borodina/Akimov/Hvorostovsky, 1998, Philips
 Tchaikovsky, Evgeny Onegin, Bychkov/Focile/Borodina/Shicoff/Hvorostovsky/Anisimov, 1992, Philips
 Tchaikovsky, Evgeny Onegin, Bychkov/Focile/Pecková/Shicoff/Hvorostovsky/Anisimov, 1992, DVD filmed in Paris, Premiere Opera
 Tchaikovsky, Evgeny Onegin, Gergiev/Fleming/Zaremba/Vargas/Hvorostovsky/Aleksashkin, 2007, DVD filmed in New York, Decca; also available for streaming in HD at Met Opera on Demand
 Tchaikovsky, Evgeny Onegin, Davis-A/Kuznetsova/Surguladze/Lopardo/Hvorostovsky/Kowaljow, 2008, live in Chicago, Premiere Opera
 Tchaikovsky, Iolanta, Gergiev/Gorchakova/Grigorian/Hvorostovsky/Aleksashkin, 1994, Philips
 Tchaikovsky, Pikovaya dama, Fedoseyev/Datsko/Arkhipova/Tarashchenko/Hvorostovsky/Gritziuk, 1990, live in Moscow, MCA
 Tchaikovsky, Pikovaya dama, Gergiev/Shevchenko/Gorr/Steblianko/Hvorostovsky/Leiferkus, 1991, live in Amsterdam, Live Opera Heaven
 Tchaikovsky, Pikovaya dama, Ozawa/Freni/Forrester/Atlantov/Hvorostovsky/Leiferkus, 1991, live in Boston, RCA
 Tchaikovsky, Pikovaya dama, Gergiev/Guleghina/Rysanek/Grigorian/Hvorostovsky/Putilin, 1995, live in New York, Opera Lovers
 Tchaikovsky, Pikovaya dama, Gergiev/Gorchakova/Söderström/Domingo/Hvorostovsky/Putilin, 1999, DVD filmed in New York, House of Opera; also available for streaming in SD at Met Opera on Demand
 Tchaikovsky, Pikovaya dama, Ozawa/Gorchakova/Gorr/Domingo/Hvorostovsky/Leiferkus, 1999, live in Vienna, House of Opera
 Tchaikovsky, Pikovaya dama, Haitink/Mattila/Barstow/Galusin/Hvorostovsky/Putilin, 2001, live in London, Celestial Audio
 Verdi, Un ballo in maschera, Noseda/Crider/Sala/Blythe/Licitra/Hvorostovsky, 2007, live in New York, Sirius
 Verdi, Un ballo in maschera, Noseda/Brown/Sala/Blythe/Licitra/Hvorostovsky, 2008, live in New York, Sirius
 Verdi, Un ballo in maschera, Luisi/Radvanovsky/Kim-K/Blythe/Álvarez-M/Hvorostovsky, 2012, video recorded live at the Met in New York, available for streaming in HD at Met Opera on Demand
 Verdi, Un ballo in maschera, Levine/Radvanovsky/Stober/Zajick/Beczala/Hvorostovsky, 2015, live in New York, Sirius
 Verdi, Don Carlos, Haitink/Gorchakova/Borodina/Margison/Hvorostovsky/Scandiuzzi, 1996, Philips
 Verdi, Don Carlos, Gergiev/Villarroel/Zajick/Margison/Hvorostovsky/Ramey, 2002, live in New York, Sirius
 Verdi, Don Carlos, Levine/Racette/Borodina/Botha/Hvorostovsky/Pape, 2006, live in New York, Sirius
 Verdi, Don Carlos, Maazel/Frittoli/Smirnova/Vargas/Hvorostovsky/Furlanetto-F, 2013, live in New York, Sirius
 Verdi, Don Carlos, Nézet-Séguin/Frittoli/Gubanova/Lee-YH/Hvorostovsky/Furlanetto-F, 2015, live in New York, Sirius
 Verdi, Ernani, Armiliato/Meade/de Biasio/Hvorostovsky/Furlanetto-F, 2012, live in New York, Sirius
 Verdi, Ernani, Armiliato/Meade/Giordani/Hvorostovsky/Furlanetto-F, 2012, video recorded live at the Met in New York, available for streaming in HD at Met Opera on Demand
 Verdi, I masnadieri, Downes/Delligatti/Farina/Hvorostovsky/Colombara, 1998, live at Baden-Baden, House of Opera
 Verdi, I masnadieri, Downes/Delligatti/Farina/Hvorostovsky/Pape, 2002, live in London*
 Verdi, Rigoletto, Downes/Siurina/Villazón/Hvorostovsky, 2005, live in London, Premiere Opera
 Verdi, Rigoletto, Heras Casado/Lungu/Polenzani/Hvorostovsky, 2013, live in New York, Sirius
 Verdi, Rigoletto, Heras Casado/Yoncheva/Polenzani/Hvorostovsky, 2013, live in New York, Sirius
 Verdi, Rigoletto, Orbelian/Sierra/Demuro/Hvorostovsky, 2016, Delos
 Verdi, Simon Boccanegra, Summers-P/Guryakova/Berti/Hvorostovsky/Aceto, 2006, live in Houston, Live Opera Heaven
 Verdi, Simon Boccanegra, Levine/Frittoli/de Biasio/Hvorostovsky/Furlanetto-F, 2011, live in New York, Sirius
 Verdi, Simon Boccanegra, Levine/Frittoli/Vargas/Hvorostovsky/Furlanetto-F, 2011, live in New York, Sirius
 Verdi, Simon Boccanegra, Orbelian/Frittoli/Secco/Hvorostovsky/Abdrazakov, 2014, Delos
 Verdi, La traviata, Mehta/Te Kanawa/Kraus/Hvorostovsky, 1993, Philips
 Verdi, La traviata, Gergiev/Fleming/Vargas/Hvorostovsky, 2004, live in New York, Sirius
 Verdi, La traviata, Maazel/Ciofi/Saccà/Hvorostovsky, 2004, DVD filmed in Venice, TDK
 Verdi, La traviata, Benini/Netrebko/Kaufmann/Hvorostovsky, 2008, live in London, Celestial Audio
 Verdi, La traviata, Luisi/Dessay/Polenzani/Hvorostovsky, 2012, video recorded live at the Met in New York, available for streaming in HD at Met Opera on Demand
 Verdi, Il trovatore, Rizzi/Villarroel/Naef/Cura/Hvorostovsky, 2002, DVD filmed in London, Opus Arte
 Verdi, Il trovatore, Luisotti/Radvanovsky/Blythe/Berti/Hvorostovsky, 2009, live in San Francisco, Premiere Opera
 Verdi, Il trovatore, Noseda/Radvanovsky/Zajick/Álvarez-M/Hvorostovsky, 2009, live in New York, Sirius
 Verdi, Il trovatore, Rizzi/Radvanovsky/Walewska/Alagna/Hvorostovsky, 2009, live in London, Premiere Opera
 Verdi, Il trovatore, Armiliato/Radvanovsky/Zajick/Álvarez-M/Hvorostovsky, 2011, DVD filmed in New York, DG; also available for streaming in HD at Met Opera on Demand
 Verdi, Il trovatore, Armiliato/Netrebko/Zajick/Lee-YH/Hvorostovsky, 2015, Oct 3, video recorded live at the Met in New York, available for streaming in HD at Met Opera on Demand, Hvorostovsky's last staged performance in that house

asterisk = label unknown, or recording exists but has not been made commercially available

Light music
Hvorostovsky's interest in Russian and other light classical and traditional song led to several recordings including:
 I Met You, My Love 2002
 Where Are You My Brothers? 2003
 Passione di Napoli 2001, Delos

References

External links

 Hvorostovsky Foundation
 Performances, Operabase
 Dmitri Hvorostovsky Virtual Archive
 Early interview with Dmitri Hvorostovsky by Bruce Duffie, 23 September 1993 (at the time of his American Operatic debut in Chicago)

1962 births
2017 deaths
Musicians from Krasnoyarsk
Russian operatic baritones
Recipients of the Order "For Merit to the Fatherland", 4th class
Deaths from brain cancer in England

People's Artists of Russia
Österreichischer Kammersänger
Russian National Music Award winners
20th-century Russian male  opera singers
21st-century Russian  male opera singers
Burials at Novodevichy Cemetery